Kitty or Kittie may refer to:

Animals
 Cat, a small, domesticated carnivorous mammal
 Kitten, a young cat

Film
 Kitty Films, an anime production company in Japan
 Kitty (1929 film), based on the Deeping novel; the first British talking picture
 Kitty (1945 film), starring Paulette Goddard
 Kitty (2002 film), a Kannada film starring Darshan
 Kitty (2016 film), a short film written and directed by Chloe Sevigny

Games and money 
 Kitty, in poker terminology, a pool of money built by collecting small amounts from certain pots, often used to buy refreshments, cards, and so on
 Kitty, in card game terminology, additional cards dealt face down in some card games
 Kitty, a colloquial term for prize money or other moneys collected by a group

Music
 Kitty (rapper) (born 1993), American musician
 "Kitty" (song), by the Presidents of The United States of America
 Kitty Kitty Corporation, a now-defunct English record label
 "Mickey" (Toni Basil song) or "Kitty", by Racey
 "Kitty", a traditional song on Red Roses for Me

Other uses
 Kitty (given name), a list of people and fictional characters with the name Kitty or Kittie
 Kitty (terminal emulator)
 Kitty (ship), a list of ships bearing the name Kitty
 Kitty, Texas, United States, a ghost town, see List of ghost towns in Texas
 Kitty (novel), a 1927 novel by Warwick Deeping
 KiTTY, a fork of the SSH and Telnet client PuTTY
 Kitty (CSI: Crime Scene Investigation), an episode of CSI: Crime Scene Investigation

See also
 Kittie, an all-female Canadian metal band
 Kity (disambiguation)
 Hello Kitty (disambiguation)
 Miss Kitty (disambiguation)
 Tropical Storm Kitty (disambiguation)